The Lyceum Pirates basketball program represents Lyceum of the Philippines University (LPU) in men's basketball as a member of the National Collegiate Athletic Association (Philippines) (NCAA). The Lyceum Pirates previously co-founded the Inter-Scholastic Athletic Association (ISAA).

History

ISAA champions 
The Lyceum Pirates previously saw the likes of Gary David and Chico Lanete play for the Intramuros-based school. Coached by Bonnie Tan starting in 2003, the Pirates won two undefeated championships in the ISAA, and two runs to the Sweet 16 in the Philippine Collegiate Champions League (PCCL).

Entry to the NCAA 
Lyceum then entered the NCAA as a guest team in 2011, and was admitted as a regular member in 2015. Tan resigned as coach in 2014, and was replaced by Topex Robinson. They would first make it to the playoffs in 2017 when CJ Perez led them to an 18–0 elimination round record, only to lose in the finals to the San Beda Red Lions. The Pirates defeated the Red Lions for the championship though in the postseason 2017 PCCL. They would meet in an NCAA Finals rematch as a #2 seed with the Red Lions in the next season, but still lost. The championship series saw Perez suspended in Game 1 for failing to notify the NCAA of his intentions to join the 2018 PBA Draft.

The Pirates then finished second in 2019, but lost to eventual champions Letran Knights in the playoffs. After being appointed as head coach of the Philippine Basketball Association's Phoenix Fuel Masters in 2018, Robinson was replaced by Jeff Perlas. Perlas himself didn't coach the Pirates in an NCAA game as he resigned due to personal reasons in 2021; he was replaced by Gilbert Malabanan. Malabanan coached the Pirates in the 2021 bubble season to 2–7 record, way off the play-in tournament places.

Current roster
NCAA Season 98

Head coaches 
 2003–2014: Bonnie Tan
 2014–2020: Topex Robinson
 2021–present: Gilbert Malabanan

Season-by-season records

References 

National Collegiate Athletic Association (Philippines) basketball teams